Niall James Horan (born 13 September 1993) is an Irish singer-songwriter. He rose to prominence as a member of the boy band One Direction, formed in 2010 on the singing competition The X Factor. The group released five albums and went on to become one of the best-selling boy bands of all time. 

Following the band's hiatus in 2016, Horan signed a recording deal as a solo artist with Capitol Records and has since released two albums: Flicker (2017) and Heartbreak Weather (2020). Flicker debuted at number one in Ireland and the US, and reached the top three  in Australia and the UK. The album's first two singles, "This Town" and "Slow Hands", reached the top twenty in several countries. Heartbreak Weather was released in March 2020, and debuted at number one in the UK, Ireland and Mexico, and at number four in the US.

Horan's third studio album, titled The Show is due for release in June 2023. It was preceded by the single "Heaven", which was released in February 2023.

Early life
Horan was born on 13 September 1993 in Mullingar, County Westmeath. He has an older brother, Greg. His parents, Bobby Horan and Maura Gallagher, divorced when he was five years old, so he and his brother lived with their mother for a year. After spending a year apart from their father, they later decided to move in with him. He had asthma as a child. He attended St. Kenny's National School, a primary school, and Mary's College, a Catholic boys school, which are both located in his hometown of Mullingar.

Horan tried to play the guitar that his brother bought for his marriage, but was not able to play it. Horan, then aged 11, taught himself how to play the guitar by following YouTube tutorials. His aunt discovered his abilities one day when she was in the car with Horan as he started singing, and she had initially thought that the radio was on. As a teenager, he performed at the Mullingar Arts Centre during a fund-raiser for the local football team, the Shamrocks. He also bagged a support slot with former X Factor contestant Lloyd Daniels at the Academy club in Dublin.

Career

2010: The X Factor
In 2010, at sixteen years old, Horan auditioned for the seventh series of The X Factor in Dublin. He sang "So Sick" and received mixed comments from the judges. Louis Walsh was in his favour, but Cheryl Cole and guest judge Katy Perry felt that he needed some time to grow. Simon Cowell voted to let him through, Cole said no, Walsh said yes, and Perry decided to vote yes. Horan was then put through to bootcamp.

At bootcamp, he sang "Champagne Supernova", but failed to qualify for the category. After a suggestion from guest judge Nicole Scherzinger, Horan was put in a group with four boys who also failed to move on in the competition, and since they were too good to let go, the judges decided to agree with Scherzinger. Horan along with Harry Styles, Liam Payne, Louis Tomlinson, and Zayn Malik formed One Direction. Styles came up with the band name, which he thought would sound good when announcer Peter Dickson read their name out on the live shows.

The group got together for two weeks to get to know each other and to practice. For their qualifying song at the "judges' houses" and their first song as a group, One Direction sang an acoustic version of "Torn". Simon Cowell later commented that the performance convinced him that the group "were confident, fun, like a gang of friends, and kind of fearless as well." Within the first four weeks of the live shows, they were Cowell's last act in the competition. During the competition, the band performed different songs such as Kelly Clarkson's "My Life Would Suck Without You" and Bonnie Tyler's "Total Eclipse of the Heart", quickly gaining popularity in the Silver Islands. They finished in 3rd place, behind runner-up Rebecca Ferguson and winner Matt Cardle.

2011–2015: One Direction
Following The X Factor, One Direction was signed by Cowell to a reported £2 million Syco record contract. They began recording their debut album in Los Angeles in January 2011. That February, a book licensed by One Direction, One Direction: Forever Young (Our Official X Factor Story), was released and topped The Sunday Times''' Best Seller list. That same month, the band and other contestants from the series participated in The X Factor Live Tour. During the tour, the group performed for 500,000 people throughout the UK. After the tour concluded in April, the group continued working on their debut album. Recording took place in Stockholm, London, and Los Angeles, as One Direction worked with producers such as Carl Falk, Savan Kotecha, Steve Mac, and Rami Yacoub.

One Direction's debut single, "What Makes You Beautiful", was released in September 2011. A global and commercial success, the song reached number one in several countries. Subsequent singles, "Gotta Be You", "One Thing", and "More than This", had also received success, with the first two becoming top ten hits in the UK. In November of that year, the group's debut album "Up All Night" was released in Ireland and the UK, reaching number one and number two on the charts, respectively. The album was released internationally in March 2012, and One Direction became the first UK group to have their debut album reach number one in the United States. To promote the album, they embarked on their first headlining concert tour, the Up All Night Tour. Originally intended with shows taking place only in Europe, additional dates in North America and Australia were added due to extreme demand. The tour was a commercial success; tickets sold out in minutes, and the tour was met with positive reviews from critics who applauded their singing abilities and stage presence. In May 2012, the band released the tour's DVD, Up All Night: The Live Tour. That same month, One Direction's first book to be licensed in America, Dare to Dream: Life as One Direction, was published and topped The New York Times Best Seller list. In September 2012, the group released "Live While We're Young", the lead single from their upcoming second album. The album's second single, "Little Things," spawned the band's second number one single in the UK. In November 2012, Take Me Home, One Direction's second album, was released. It reached number one in over 35 countries, and, after reaching number one on the Billboard 200, the group became the first boy band in US chart history to record two number-one albums in the same calendar year alongside becoming the first group since 2008 to record two number-one albums in the same year. To support the album, they embarked on their second headlining tour, the Take Me Home Tour, playing over 120 shows over four continents. In August 2013, One Direction: This Is Us, a 3-D documentary concert film was released and was a box office success, grossing over $68.5 million. One Direction's third book, One Direction: Where We Are: Our Band, Our Story: 100% Official, was released that same month.

The band's third studio album, Midnight Memories, was released on 25 November 2013. It was the best-selling album worldwide in 2013 with 4 million copies sold globally. "Best Song Ever", the album's lead single, is One Direction's highest charting single in the US to date. Following the album's released, the group embarked on the Where We Are Tour. The band's first all-stadium tour, tickets sold out in minutes, and more shows were added due to "overwhelming demand." The band averaged 49,848 fans per show. The tour grossed over $290 million and was the highest-grossing tour of 2014, the 15th highest-grossing concert tour of all time, and is still the highest-grossing tour of all time by a vocal group. In September 2014, One Direction's fourth book, One Direction: Who We Are: Our Official Autobiography was released. The group's second concert film, One Direction: Where We Are – The Concert Film, was released in October 2014, showing footage of the band's shows at San Siro Stadium in Milan, Italy. In November 2014, One Direction released their fourth album, Four. The last album to include Zayn Malik, singles "Steal My Girl" and "Night Changes" both received platinum status. The album debuted number one in 18 countries, and One Direction became the only group in the 58-year history of the Billboard 200 albums chart to have their first four albums debut at number one. In February 2015, the band embarked on the On The Road Again Tour, playing shows in Australia, Asia, Africa, Europe, and North America. Over 2.3 million tickets were sold with a gross of $208 million. In November 2015, Made in the A.M., their fifth album, was released. Led by singles "Drag Me Down" and "Perfect", the album reached number one in multiple countries, including the UK, while it reached number two on the US Billboard 200. Following the release of the album the group went on an indefinite hiatus.

2016–2018: Flicker and Modest Golf Management

In February 2016, Modest Golf, a golf management company that Horan founded together with Mark McDonnell and Ian Watts, was released. Modest Golf has since signed several golf players. In March 2019, Modest Golf earned its first European tour win when Italian golfer Guido Migliozzi, the first golfer that the company signed back in August 2016, won the Kenyan Open. On 29 September 2016, Horan released his debut single "This Town" with Capitol Records.. Since its release, it has peaked at number 9 on the UK Singles Chart and number 20 on the US Billboard Hot 100. 

On 4 May 2017, Horan released his second single "Slow Hands". It also entered the top 10 in the UK and the top 20 in the US. HE embarked on a worldwide tour, Flicker Sessions 2017, which started in August to promote his debut album Flicker.  On 15 September 2017, Horan released his third single from the album, "Too Much to Ask". Flicker was released on 20 October 2017, and debuted atop the Billboard 200. It also reached number one in Ireland and the Netherlands. On 8 November 2017, he performed "Seeing Blind" alongside Maren Morris at the 51st Country Music Association Awards. In 2018, he embarked on the Flicker World Tour. His song for the SmallFoot soundtrack, "Finally Free", received a nomination from the Hollywood Music in Media Awards for Best Original Song in an Animated Film. He also performed tracks from Flicker for RTÉ and the recordings from the session was included in a live album called Flicker: Featuring the RTÉ Concert Orchestra.

2019–present: Heartbreak Weather, The Voice, and The Show
In March 2019, he was featured on Julia Michaels' song "What a Time". His second studio album Heartbreak Weather's lead single, "Nice to Meet Ya", was released on 4 October 2019. "Put a Little Love on Me" was released as the album's second single on 6 December 2019. On 30 October, Horan announced that he would be embarking on the Nice to Meet Ya Tour in 2020. However, the tour was later cancelled due to the COVID-19 pandemic. On 7 February 2020, Horan released the album's third single, "No Judgement" The album was released on 13 March 2020, and debuted at number four on the US Billboard 200 and number one on the UK Albums Chart. Whilst in lockdown, the singer co-wrote a new version of Ashe's song, "Moral of the Story", which was released in June 2020. In 2021, Horan and English singer Anne-Marie released a single called "Our Song" and a cover of Fleetwood Mac's song "Everywhere" for the BBC's Children in Need alongside other UK musicians. In 2022, his TV special that was sponsored by Guinness, Homecoming: The Road to Mullingar with Lewis Capaldi aired on Virgin Media Ireland and was later released to Amazon Prime.
 
"Heaven", the lead single of his upcoming third studio album The Show, was released on 17 February 2023. The single debuted at number 4 on the Irish singles chart one week later. Horan became one of the coaches on the 23rd season of The Voice. On 17 March 2023, Horan performed "Heaven" at the White House's Saint Patrick's Day celebrations.

Artistry
Horan's music style has been categorized as soft rock, folk, folk-pop, country, pop,, indie folk, and pop rock. His tenor voice has been described as "sweet, high, [and] slightly grainy." Horan cited Michael Bublé as one of his biggest influences because they had similar life histories, as Buble's vocal talent was discovered by his aunt and the same thing happened to Bublé, except his talent was discovered by his father. In the early years of his career, he was inspired by Justin Bieber. Horan also admires the work of classic rock acts like The Eagles, Fleetwood Mac, and Bruce Springsteen.

Personal life
Horan enjoyed playing a number of sports while growing up, including golf, football, and Gaelic football. In the summer of 2010, while playing football with friends, he injured his knee and was diagnosed with a floating kneecap. The problem recurred several times over the next couple of years, including a 2013 incident where he dislocated his knee onstage during a concert in Antwerp, Belgium. Horan went to the United States for major reconstructive surgery in January 2014, after the tour ended. After the surgery, he was invited to do physical therapy with Chelsea by their manager, José Mourinho. Horan went through more than seven weeks of physical therapy with the members of the team and their physical therapist at their training ground in Surrey.

In April 2018, Horan opened up on his diagnosis of mild OCD and his anxiety. Horan started dating American actress/singer Hailee Steinfeld in December 2017. The two broke up in December 2018. Horan began dating account manager Amelia Woolley in 2020. He splits his time between Los Angeles and South London.

Horan is Catholic and is the godfather of his nephew.

Advocacy

In 2010, Horan canvassed for the Labour Party. 

As a former member of One Direction, Horan was involved in the Action 1D campaign that "aims to end extreme poverty, tackle inequality and slow down climate change with the help of their millions of fans". The band also supported Comic Relief.

In May 2014, Horan hosted the Charity Football Challenge at Leicester City's King Power Stadium to raise money for Irish Autism Action. The celebrity football match had 10,000 spectators and raised about £300,000 for the charity. In 2016, Horan continued to support Irish Autism Action by creating limited edition T-shirts.

Horan was a part of the Soccer Aid 2016 and 2019 star lineup to raise funds for UNICEF to benefit children around the world. In 2017, Horan received an Arnie Award for his work with charities.  

Horan has been actively involved with the Drive, Chip, and Putt initiative that encourages and supports the younger generation of golfers. He has also spoken about his desire to grow female participation in golf as well as wanting more support and promotion for women golfers, stating "golf is seen as a rich man's sport" and "we need more teenage girls involved". Since 2016, his management company and Justin Rose has put together fundraising shows called "Horan & Rose" to benefit Cancer Research UK and The Black Heart Foundation.

He has expressed his support for the Repeal of the Eighth Amendment and the Black Lives Matter movement. 

On November 7, 2020, Horan played a special live-streamed concert at the Royal Albert Hall to support his touring crew and We Need Crew during the COVID-19 pandemic.

In 2023, he performed at the White House for Joe Biden and Leo Varadkar's St. Patrick’s Day Celebration.

Filmography

Film

Television

Discography

 Flicker (2017)
 Heartbreak Weather (2020)
 The Show'' (2023)

Notes

References

External links

 

1993 births
Living people
21st-century Irish male singers
Capitol Records artists
Folk-pop singers
Irish guitarists
Irish pop singers
Irish male singer-songwriters
Irish expatriates in the United Kingdom
One Direction members
People from Mullingar
Pop rock singers
Soft rock musicians
Irish folk singers
Irish country singers
Indie folk musicians
Irish rock singers
Shorty Award winners